The 1973 Dutch Open was a combined men's and women's tennis tournament staged in Hilversum, Netherlands. The men's event was part of the Grand Prix circuit and categorized in Group C. The tournament was played on outdoor clay courts and was held from 16 July to 23 July 1973. It was the 17th edition of the tournament. Tom Okker and Betty Stöve won the singles titles.

Finals

Men's singles

 Tom Okker defeated  Andrés Gimeno 2–6, 6–4, 6–4, 6–7, 6–3

Women's singles
 Betty Stöve defeated  Helga Masthoff 7–5, 6–2

Men's doubles
 Iván Molina /  Allan Stone defeated  Andrés Gimeno /  Antonio Muñoz 4–6, 7–6, 6–4

Women's doubles
 Betty Stöve /  Helga Masthoff defeated  Trudy Walhof /  Brigitte Cuypers 6–2, 7–6

Mixed doubles
 Tine Zwaan /  Geoff Masters defeated  Betty Stöve /  Geoff Masters 6–1, 6–4

References

External links
 ITF tournament edition details

Dutch Open (tennis)
Dutch Open (tennis)
Dutch Open
Dutch Open
Dutch Open (tennis), 1973